José Eduardo Gavica (born 8 January 1969) is a retired Ecuadorian football midfielder.

International career
He was a member of the Ecuador national football team for eleven years, and obtained a total number of 34 caps during his career.

Career statistics

International goals

References

External links

1969 births
Living people
Sportspeople from Guayaquil
Association football midfielders
Ecuadorian footballers
Ecuador international footballers
1993 Copa América players
1997 Copa América players
Barcelona S.C. footballers
Everton de Viña del Mar footballers
Delfín S.C. footballers
C.D. El Nacional footballers
C.S.D. Macará footballers
Ecuadorian expatriate footballers
Expatriate footballers in Chile